The Comics We Loved: Selection of 20th Century Comics and Creators from the Region of Former Yugoslavia is a guidebook to 20th Century Yugoslavian comic books. It was co-authored by Zdravko Zupan and Zoran Stefanović and edited by Živojin Tamburić.  The book was published in Serbia by Modest Stripovi in 2011.

Summary 

Yugoslavia in the 20th century was a region that was not only massively developing comics’ culture, but was also producing many important works in the history of comics. This tradition has continued even today in the countries which were a part of the former Yugoslavia: Serbia, Croatia, North Macedonia, Slovenia, Bosnia and Herzegovina and Montenegro.

The book provides basic information, panel examples, and critiques or citations from critiques for about 400 comics from about 400 authors (about 200 artists, 150 scriptwriters, and 50 writers whose works were used in comics). With the help of about 100 comics critics from the whole of the Western Balkans, the book has been written and compiled by three co-authors – Živojin Tamburić (who is also initiator and editor of the book), Zdravko Zupan, and Zoran Stefanović.

The criteria that were used for the selection of comics are aesthetic and professional achievements, popularity, originality, sociological relevance, and curiosities. The book is distinguished by many special research materials and a rediscovery of many forgotten authors’ opuses after many decades of obscurity. The book is published in Serbian, but the most important parts are translated into English.

Reception 

"In this book, these intrepid, discriminating compilers have realized an exceptional achievement by combing diligently through thousands of pages of comics and comics reviews to distill a captivating alphabet of artists and writers who have shaped and enhanced not only the comics of their homeland but in several cases the comics of the world." — Paul Gravett, writer, curator, international comics historian, director of Comica Festival, London

"Jury's decision was based on the excellence and grandeur of this project, which thoroughly analyzes, systematizes, and popularizes 20th-century comic books in former Yugoslavia. The authors of this lexicon of critical essays, which are all top experts in their field, have proven to be fully competent to create such a detailed and ambitious project to serve as a testimony to the history of comic book culture, its quality surpassing all borders as it can boast obvious regional significance." — Belgrade Book Fair Jury for Serbian Edition of the Year Award.

"When you have in one place a complete overview of the most important authors, magazines, and critics of comics, it means you have a guide which you can absolutely trust." Momčilo Rajin, art historian, editor, and author

"The Comics We Loved by Živojin Tamburić, Zdravko Zupan, and Zoran Stefanović represents a pioneering achievement in the history and critique of the 9th Art in Serbia and Yugoslavia." - Vasa Pavković, writer, editor and critic

"The Comics We Loved is the book that in the 21st century will draw attention to this previously less emphasized cultural factor, which shaped the consciousness of contemporaries in the previous century." - Slobodan Ivkov, editor, critic and curator

Awards and recognitions 
 “Award for the Best Publishing Achievement of the Year” on the Book Fair in Belgrade, 2011, for The Comics We Loved.
 “Comic Event of the Year” by NIN magazine, Belgrade, 2011, for The Comics We Loved.

References

External links 
 The Comics We Loved, "Omnibus", Belgrade, official publisher's page

Books about comics
2011 non-fiction books
Yugoslav comics
Serbian comics
Croatian comics
Macedonian comics
Slovenian comics
Encyclopedias of art
Serbian-language encyclopedias
English-language encyclopedias
Books about Yugoslavia
21st-century encyclopedias